Abbey is a hamlet in the English county of Devon. It is located in the Blackdown Hills, a group of hills that border both Devon and Somerset. Dunkeswell Abbey is situated in the hamlet.

Notes

References

Villages in Devon